Ludwig Averkamp (16 February 1927 – 29 July 2013) was a German prelate of the Catholic Church. He served as Bishop of Osnabrück from 1987 to 1994, and Archbishop of Hamburg from 1994 to 2002.

Biography
Born in Velen, Averkamp was ordained to the priesthood by Archbishop Ettore Cunial on 10 October 1954.

On 18 January 1973 he was appointed Auxiliary Bishop of Münster and Titular Bishop of Thapsus. Averkamp received his episcopal consecration on the following 24 February from Bishop Heinrich Tenhumberg, with Bishops Heinrich Baaken and Laurenz Böggering serving as co-consecrators.

He was named Coadjutor Bishop of Osnabrück on 7 November 1985, and succeeded Helmut Wittler on 9 September 1987. Averkamp was later made the first Archbishop of Hamburg by Pope John Paul II on 24 October 1994; he was installed as such on 7 January 1995.

Upon reaching age 75, Averkamp resigned as Hamburg's archbishop on 16 February 2002, after seven years of service. The Archbishop Emeritus was also a member of the European Academy of Sciences and Arts, in World Religions.

References

External links
Archdiocese of Hamburg - in German
Letter of Pope John Paul II to Archbishop Averkamp

1927 births
2013 deaths
German military personnel of World War II
Archbishops of Hamburg
Roman Catholic bishops of Osnabrück
20th-century Roman Catholic archbishops in Germany
21st-century Roman Catholic archbishops in Germany
Members of the European Academy of Sciences and Arts
20th-century German Roman Catholic priests
People from Borken (district)